Al-Mundhir IV ibn al-Mundhir was the king of the Lakhmid Arabs in 575–580.

The son of al-Mundhir III ibn al-Nu'man, he succeeded to the throne after his brothers Amr and Qabus.  His succession was unpopular with the inhabitants of the capital, al-Hirah, because of his violent nature and his paganism. A Persian governor, Suhrab, was appointed and ruled Hirah for a year, until Zayd ibn Hammad (father of the poet Adi ibn Zayd) persuaded the people to accept Mundhir as their king.

The events of his reign are mostly obscure, except for the sack and razing of Hirah by the Ghassanids under al-Mundhir III ibn al-Harith. He was succeeded by his son al-Nu'man III ibn al-Mundhir, the last Lakhmid king of Hirah.

Two of his wives are known by name: Salma bint al-Sa'igh, the mother of his heir al-Nu'man, a Jew captured during a raid on Fadak; and the Christian Mariya bint al-Harith ibn Julhum from the tribe of Taym al-Ribab, mother of a son named al-Aswad. Mundhir had twelve or thirteen sons, but only al-Nu'man and al-Aswad are known by name.

References

Sources
 
 
 

6th-century monarchs in the Middle East
580 deaths
Lakhmid kings
People of the Roman–Sasanian Wars
Year of birth unknown
6th-century Arabs
Vassal rulers of the Sasanian Empire
Arabs from the Sasanian Empire